Cerezo Hilgen (born 3 May 1994) is a Dutch football player who plays as a centre-back.

Club career
He made his professional debut in the Eerste Divisie for FC Dordrecht on 9 December 2016 in a game against SC Telstar. In 2018 he joined Greek side Kalamata, despite aiming to find an Asian club to join.

References

External links
 

1994 births
Living people
Footballers from Amsterdam
Association football defenders
Dutch footballers
Amsterdamsche FC players
FC Volendam players
OFC Oostzaan players
FC Lienden players
FC Dordrecht players
Rot-Weiss Frankfurt players
Kalamata F.C. players
Luftëtari Gjirokastër players
Ungmennafélagið Víkingur players
Eskilstuna City FK players
Eerste Divisie players
Kategoria Superiore players
Dutch expatriate footballers
Expatriate footballers in Germany
Dutch expatriate sportspeople in Germany
Expatriate footballers in Greece
Dutch expatriate sportspeople in Greece
Expatriate footballers in Albania
Dutch expatriate sportspeople in Australia
Expatriate footballers in Iceland
Dutch expatriate sportspeople in Iceland
Expatriate footballers in Sweden
Dutch expatriate sportspeople in Sweden